The Leonese rock lizard (Iberolacerta galani) is a species of lizard in the family Lacertidae.

Geographic range
I. galani is an endemic species from the Montes de León in northwestern Spain.

Etymology
Its specific name, galani, honors the Corunnan herpetologist Dr. Pedro Galán Regalado for his lifelong dedication to the study of the Iberian herpetofauna and natural history in general.

Description
This species, I. galani, is characterized by its relatively large size. It is the biggest species of Iberolacerta with females reaching  snout-to-vent length (SVL). It is also characterized by a high number of blue ocelli on the shoulders, and the relatively frequent contact or near-contact between the supranasal and the first loreal scale.

Habitat
The Leonese rock lizard inhabits supraforestal habitats with a high-mountain climate.

References

Iberolacerta
Reptiles described in 2006
Lizards of Europe
Endemic reptiles of the Iberian Peninsula
Endemic fauna of Spain
Taxa named by Oscar J. Arribas
Taxa named by Salvador Carranza
Taxa named by Gaetano Odierna